Oleksandr Iasynovyi (born Aug 4, 1966) is a visually impaired Paralympic athlete from Ukraine. He competes in throwing events, specialising in discus.

At the 2000 Summer Paralympics in Sydney, he competed in the F13 classification. He won a silver medal in shot put. In the F13 discus event he won gold, and set an F13 world record that still stands 12 years later.

Following deterioration of his vision, Iasynovyi competed in the F12 classification at the 2008 Summer Paralympics in Beijing. There, he won a bronze medal in the men's F11-12 discus throw event. At the 2011 IPC Athletics World Championships, Iasynovyi won gold in the Men's F12 discus event.

References

External links
 

Paralympic athletes of Ukraine
Athletes (track and field) at the 2008 Summer Paralympics
Paralympic bronze medalists for Ukraine
Living people
World record holders in Paralympic athletics
Paralympic gold medalists for Ukraine
Athletes (track and field) at the 2000 Summer Paralympics
Ukrainian male discus throwers
Visually impaired discus throwers
Paralympic discus throwers
1966 births
Paralympic silver medalists for Ukraine
Medalists at the 2000 Summer Paralympics
Medalists at the 2008 Summer Paralympics
Paralympic medalists in athletics (track and field)